Teixeira de Melo (born José Alexandre Teixeira de Melo) was a Brazilian doctor, journalist, historian and poet. He was born in Campos, Rio de Janeiro, on August 28, 1833, and died in Rio de Janeiro on April 10, 1907. He was the founder of Chair 6 of the Brazilian Academy of Letters, choosing as a patron the poet Casimiro de Abreu, who was his friend. He was replaced by Admiral Jaceguai.

He was the son of José Alexandre Teixeira de Melo and Eugênia Maria da Conceição Torres. He studied humanities at the São José Seminary and graduated from the Faculty of Medicine of Rio de Janeiro, where he defended his thesis on November 25, 1859. He settled in Campos, where he ran a medical clinic and contributed to newspapers, until 1875. He then moved to Rio de Janeiro. As a journalist, he signed articles with his own name and also with the pseudonym Anódino. He was a member of several literary organizations. He published a book of poems Sombras e Sonhos in 1858. In 1876 he was appointed head of the Manuscripts Section of the National Library, later moving to the Print Section and, finally, taking over the direction of the Library in 1895. He held the position until 1900, when he retired. He traveled through Europe during 1892 and 1893.

A tireless researcher, he dedicated himself to matters of national history, researching, in the manuscript archives, the documents that would secure the rights of Brazil to contested territories, serving as the basis for the arguments of Joaquim Nabuco and Rio Branco. He published several valuable works, such as Efemérides nacionais e Limites do Brasil com a Confederação Argentina. He wrote for the Annals of the National Library, in the Revista do Instituto Histórico e Geográfico Brasileiro, in the Gazeta Literária and in other publications.

As a poet, Teixeira de Melo belonged to the romantic generation of Casimiro de Abreu, Luís Delfino and Luís Guimarães. In the preface to his Poetry (1914), Sílvio Romero qualified him as “a first-rate lyricist”, who is distinguished by “a certain singularity, a certain graceful and delicate elevation of the phrases”, in addition to the complete correctness of language and metric form, characteristics that make his work a precursor to Parnassianism.

References

Brazilian poets